The discography of American rapper Pusha T consists of four studio albums, one extended play (EP), two mixtapes, 53 singles (including 31 as a featured artist), two promotional singles and 33 music videos.

Pusha T began his music career, alongside his brother No Malice (formerly Malice), forming a hip hop duo Clipse. While together as a duo, they 
released three studio albums, before they released another album with hip hop group Re-Up Gang and launched their record label Re-Up Records. In total, they released four studio albums and several mixtapes before taking their hiatus in 2010. During that time, Pusha T got started on his solo career, signing a deal to Kanye West's GOOD Music imprint and releasing his first mixtape, Fear of God (2011). The mixtape was later re-packaged and re-released for purchase, as an EP, titled Fear of God II: Let Us Pray (2011). The lead single from both projects was his commercial debut single, "My God". The EP spawned and supported by two more singles; "Trouble on My Mind" featuring Tyler, the Creator and "Amen" featuring Kanye West and Young Jeezy.

Upon his signing to GOOD Music, he began to work heavily with his label-mates as well as Kanye West. He appeared on several tracks from West's weekly song giveaway, called GOOD Fridays. In late 2012, Pusha T ultimately appeared on GOOD Music's compilation album Cruel Summer, five times; including the singles "Mercy" with Kanye West, Big Sean and 2 Chainz, and "New God Flow" (with West). While working on the compilation, he was also working on his debut studio album, My Name Is My Name. The album was on October 8, 2013, under GOOD Music and Def Jam.
 
In December 2015, Pusha T released the album King Push – Darkest Before Dawn. The album was set to serve as a prelude to Pusha T's third album, King Push. However, the album suffered from numerous delays, and instead, Daytona was released in May 2018.

In April 2022, Pusha T's fourth studio album It's Almost Dry was released as the follow-up to Daytona. It became his first number one album on the Billboard 200.

Studio albums

EPs

Mixtapes

Singles

As lead artist

As featured artist

Promotional singles

Other charted and certified songs

Guest appearances

Production discography

Music videos

As lead artist

As featured artist

See also
 Clipse discography

Notes

References

External links
 Pusha T at AllMusic
 
 

Hip hop discographies
Discographies of American artists